The Camas Formation is a Mesozoic geologic formation in Mexico. Dinosaur remains are among the fossils that have been recovered from the formation, although none have yet been referred to a specific genus.

See also

 List of dinosaur-bearing rock formations
 List of stratigraphic units with indeterminate dinosaur fossils

References

Bibliography 
  

Geologic formations of Mexico
Mesozoic Mexico